This is a list of fossiliferous stratigraphic units in Seychelles.



See also 
 Lists of fossiliferous stratigraphic units in Africa
 List of fossiliferous stratigraphic units in Madagascar
 Geology of Seychelles

References

Further reading 
 J. D. Taylor. 1978. Faunal response to the instability of reef habitats: Pleistocene molluscan assemblages of Aldabra Atoll. Palaeontology 21(1):1-30

List
Seychelles
Seychelles
Fossiliferous stratigraphic units
Fossil